Arkhan Kaka Putra Purwanto (born 2 September 2007) is an Indonesian professional footballer who plays as a forward for Liga 1 club Persis Solo and the Indonesia national under-20 team.

Personal life 
Arkhan Kaka was born in Blitar in East Java. His father, a former footballer who also plays as a striker named Purwanto Suwondo. His father has played for a number of Indonesian clubs, including Arema and Persebaya Surabaya.

Club career 
Arkhan joined a Liga 1 club Persis Solo at 1 February 2022. Before Arkhan joined Persis Solo, Arkhan started his football career at SSB Tunas Muda Blitar. Then, Arkhan had time to strengthen Bhayangkara FC at the Elite Pro Academy U-16 2022. He became one of Bhayangkara FC's top scorers.

International career 
In the selection process in May 2021, the process of his struggle to enter the national team squad did not go smoothly. His name was even crossed out by the Indonesia under-17 team head coach, Bima Sakti. Luckily in Elite Pro Academy U-16 2022 Arkhan managed to prove his ability, so that he could pass the selection of the Indonesia under-17 team.

In July 2022, he made his debut on the 2022 AFF U-16 Youth Championship against Philippines U-17 which he scored one goal in that match. Arkhan and his national team won in the final stage against Vietnam U-17 and achieved their champion on the tournament which Arkhan scored a total of two goals.

On 5 October 2022, Arkhan scored a quatrick against Guam U-17 in a 14-0 win at the 2023 AFC U-17 Asian Cup qualification.

In January 2023, Arkhan was called up by Shin Tae-Yong to the Indonesia under-20 team for the training centre in preparation for 2023 AFC U-20 Asian Cup. On January 17, 2023, Arkhan made his debut for the team against Fiji under-20 in a 4–0 win.

Career statistics

International appearances 
International under-17 appearances

International goals 
International under-17 goals

Honours

International 

Indonesia U-17
 AFF U-16 Youth Championship: 2022

References 

2007 births
Living people
Indonesian footballers
Association football forwards
Persis Solo players